Music Sounds Better with You is the fifth studio album by Swedish indie pop band Acid House Kings. It was released on 22 March 2011 by Labrador Records.

Five singles were released from Music Sounds Better with You: "Are We Lovers or Are We Friends?", "Would You Say Stop?", "Under Water", "(I'm In) A Chorus Line" and a remix of "I Just Called to Say Jag Älskar Dig". Additionally, the track "Heaven Knows I Miss Him Now" was re-recorded by the band with Dan Treacy of Television Personalities and released as a single.

Track listing

Personnel
Credits for Music Sounds Better with You adapted from album liner notes.

Acid House Kings
 Johan Angergård – bass, guitar, keyboards, backing vocals
 Niklas Angergård – vocals, bass, guitar, keyboards, percussion, piano
 Julia Lannerheim – vocals

Additional musicians
 Andil Dahl – piano
 Pernilla Larsson – flute
 Erik Palmberg – trumpet

Production
 Johan Angergård – production
 Niklas Angergård – production
 Björn Engelman – mastering

Artwork and design
 Peter Eriksson – artwork
 Henrik Halvarsson – photography

References

2011 albums
Acid House Kings albums
Labrador Records albums